Benátky may refer to places in the Czech Republic:

Benátky (Hradec Králové District), a municipality and village in the Hradec Králové Region
Benátky (Svitavy District), a municipality and village in the Pardubice Region
Benátky, a village and part of Jimramov in the Vysočina Region
Benátky, a village and part of Pelhřimov in the Vysočina Region
Benátky, a village and part of Úžice in the Central Bohemian Region
Benátky, a village and part of Ždírec nad Doubravou in the Vysočina Region
Benátky nad Jizerou, a town in the Central Bohemian Region

See also
Venice, a city in Italy called Benátky in Czech